Garden City University, formally known as Garden City College is a private university located in Bangalore, Karnataka, India.

Established in the year 1992, Garden City University was formed by Dr. Joseph V.G with other contemporaries like Prof. Shivarudrappa who is a former dean of Karnataka University, Dr. Hanumanthappa who is a former vice-chancellor of Bangalore University, Prof. V.B.Coutinho, vice-chancellor of Gulbarga University, and Prof. Rame Gowda who is a former vice-chancellor of Karnataka State Open University.

The new campus is located on 50-acres adjacent to the Volvo manufacturing plant. The university's new plan will accommodate hotels, convention halls, knowledge parks, IT and BT parks, shopping malls, and residential areas.

Academics

The School of Commerce and Management 
Established in the year 1994, the commerce and management department is one of the oldest and the largest in the entire Garden City University Campus.

The School of Sciences 
Established in the year 1995.

The School of Media 
Established in the year 1997.

The School of Computational Science and Information Technology 
Established in the year 1995. Some of the modules include webinars, simulated software, live projects, etc.

The School of Health Science

The School of Indian & Foreign Languages 
Established in the year 1994, the school of languages functions as a supporting school for all other branches at the Garden City University. The main focus is to introduce a wider range of literature in English and other foreign languages. At the primary level, this school offers various opportunities for its students a plethora of programs such as novels, plays, and poetry. And in the secondary level, the students are exposed to political issues and socio-cultural issues that the students can connect with the contemporary literature.

The School of Social Science 
This school was started in the year 1994 at the Garden City University.

Awards
Garshom International Awards - Best Institution Award 2017

References

External links 
 

Private universities in India
Universities in Bangalore
2013 establishments in Karnataka
Educational institutions established in 2013
Garshom Awardees